This list is about Hammarby IF players with at least 100 league appearances, or at least 40 league goals. For players with fewer appearances, see List of Hammarby Fotboll players (50–99 appearances). For a list of all Hammarby IF players with a Wikipedia article, see :Category:Hammarby Fotboll players. For the current Hammarby IF first-team squad, see First-team squad.

Hammarby IF Fotbollförening, commonly known as Hammarby Fotboll, is a Swedish professional football club founded in 1915 and based in Stockholm. The club is affiliated with Stockholms Fotbollförbund (The Stockholm Football Association), and plays its home games at Tele2 Arena. 

The club is placed 12th in the all-time Allsvenskan table, the Swedish first league, and has won the domestic championship title once, in 2001.

Midfielder Kenneth Ohlsson is the player with the most league appearances in the club's history, having made 396 appearances between 1966 and 1983, scoring 82 goals. Forward Billy Ohlsson, his brother, is the player who has scored the most league goals for Hammarby IF, with 94 goals in 217 matches between 1972–1978 and 1980–1986.

Key

General
League appearances and goals are for first-team competitive league matches only, including Allsvenskan, Svenska Serien, Superettan, Division 1, Division 2, Division 3 and Division 4 matches. Qualification and play-off matches are included, as well as substitute appearances.
Players are listed according to the total number of league games played, the player with the most goals scored is ranked higher if two or more players are tied.

Table headers
 Nationality – If a player played international football, the country/countries he played for are shown. Otherwise, the player's nationality is given as their country of birth.
 Hammarby Fotboll career – The year of the player's first appearance for Hammarby Fotboll to the year of his last appearance.
 League appearances – The number of games played in league competition.
 League goals – The number of goals scored in league competition.

Players

Appearances
Statistics correct as of matches played 11 November 2022.

300+ appearances

200+ appearances

150+ appearances

100+ appearances

Goals

40+ goals
This is a list of players with less than 100 league appearances that scored at least 40 league goals for Hammarby.

Notable club captains

Footnotes

References

List
Players
Hammarby IF
Association football player non-biographical articles